Zuehl is an unincorporated area and census-designated place in western Guadalupe County, Texas, United States. It is part of the San Antonio Metropolitan Statistical Area. The population was 362 at the 2010 census.

Once known as "Perryman's Crossing", it was a crossing on the Wood Road, an early road between Gonzales and San Antonio. Wilhem Zuehl bought the land in 1870 and two years later opened a store, from which the community took its name.

Geography
Zuehl is located on the western edge of Guadalupe County at  (29.491600, -98.152772). The western border of the CDP follows Cibolo Creek, which is also the Bexar County line. Zuehl is bordered to the north by the city of Cibolo and to the east by New Berlin. Interstate 10 runs just north of the northern border of Zuehl, within Cibolo, and with access from Exit 595. I-10 leads east  to Seguin, the Guadalupe County seat, and west  to San Antonio.

Demographics
As of the census of 2000, there were 346 people, 128 households, and 103 families residing in the CDP. The population density was 48.6 people per square mile (18.8/km2). There were 140 housing units at an average density of 19.7/sq mi (7.6/km2). The racial makeup of the CDP was 94.80% White, 0.58% Native American, 0.58% Asian, 2.60% from other races, and 1.45% from two or more races. Hispanic or Latino of any race were 8.67% of the population.

There were 128 households, out of which 30.5% had children under the age of 18 living with them, 70.3% were married couples living together, 7.8% had a female householder with no husband present, and 19.5% were non-families. 17.2% of all households were made up of individuals, and 4.7% had someone living alone who was 65 years of age or older. The average household size was 2.70 and the average family size was 2.98.

In the CDP, the population was spread out, with 22.8% under the age of 18, 8.4% from 18 to 24, 25.4% from 25 to 44, 29.5% from 45 to 64, and 13.9% who were 65 years of age or older. The median age was 41 years. For every 100 females, there were 108.4 males. For every 100 females age 18 and over, there were 107.0 males.

The median income for a household in the CDP was $37,292, and the median income for a family was $51,250. Males had a median income of $27,083 versus $37,431 for females. The per capita income for the CDP was $33,840. About 8.6% of families and 6.3% of the population were below the poverty line, including none of those under the age of eighteen or sixty-five or over.

Education
Zuehl is served by the Marion Independent School District.

References

External links
 
 

Census-designated places in Guadalupe County, Texas
Populated places established in 1872
Census-designated places in Texas
Greater San Antonio
Ghost towns in Central Texas
1872 establishments in Texas